First National Bank and Trust Building or First National Bank and Trust Company Building may refer to:

First National Bank and Trust Company Building (Flint, Michigan), listed on the National Register of Historic Places in Genesee County, Michigan
First National Bank and Trust Building (Lima, Ohio), listed on the National Register of Historic Places in Allen County, Ohio
First National Bank and Trust Company Building (Perry, Oklahoma), listed on the National Register of Historic Places in Noble County, Oklahoma
First National Bank and Trust Building (Bryan, Texas), listed on the National Register of Historic Places in Brazos County, Texas